Elemér von Barcza (13 September 1904 – 13 July 1987) was a Hungarian equestrian. He competed in two events at the 1936 Summer Olympics.

References

External links
 

1904 births
1987 deaths
Hungarian male equestrians
Olympic equestrians of Hungary
Equestrians at the 1936 Summer Olympics
People from Komárom
Sportspeople from Komárom-Esztergom County